Maslany is a surname. Notable people with the surname include:

 Daniel Maslany, Canadian actor
 Marek Maślany (born 1966), Polish weightlifter
 Tatiana Maslany (born 1985), Canadian actress

See also
 

Polish-language surnames
Ukrainian-language surnames